Osiris is an Egyptian deity.

Osiris may also refer to:

Astronomy
 1923 Osiris, an asteroid
 Osiris (lunar crater)
 Osiris (planet) or HD 209458 b, an extrasolar planet
 Osiris (Ganymede crater), a crater on Ganymede
 OSIRIS-REx, a NASA New Frontiers mission to return samples from an asteroid
 Odin-OSIRIS, an atmospheric measurement instrument
 OH-Suppressing Infrared Integral Field Spectrograph
 Optical System for Imaging and low Resolution Integrated Spectroscopy
 Optical, Spectroscopic, and Infrared Remote Imaging System

Entertainment
 Osiris (DC Comics), any of three characters from DC Comics
 Osiris (funk band), 1970s funk band led by Tyrone Brunson
 Osiris (Marvel Comics), a fictional character in the Marvel Comics universe
 Osiris (Stargate), a character in Stargate SG-1
 Osiris (symphony), a symphony by Gamal Abdel-Rahim
 Osiris: New Dawn, an action-adventure video game
 Born of Osiris, American heavy metal musical ensemble

People
 Daniel Iffla, French financier and philanthropist also known as Osiris
 YK Osiris (Osiris Jahkail Williams), American rapper and singer

Other
 Osiris (bee), a genus of cleptoparasitic bees
 Osiris (journal), a scholarly journal on the history of science
 Osiris (software)
 Osiris, Missouri, a community in the United States
 Osiris Shoes, a skateboarding footwear company
 Osiris, a South Devon Railway Comet class steam locomotive
 HMS Osiris, an Oberon-class submarine in the Royal Navy
 Optical Space Infrared Downlink System, a series of German satellite experiments.

See also 
Osyris, a genus of plants
Osirak, an Iraqi nuclear reactor based on the French-designed Osiris reactor

id:Osiris